Paul Houck (born August 12, 1963 in Vancouver, British Columbia) is a former ice hockey player. He had a successful college career with the University of Wisconsin between 1981 and 1985, and was named a Western Collegiate Hockey Association Second Team All-Star in 1983, as well as earning a spot on the National Collegiate Athletic Association Championship All-Tournament team.  He was selected 71st overall by the Edmonton Oilers in the 1981 NHL Entry Draft, and traded to the Minnesota North Stars in 1985.  Houck played 16 National Hockey League games for the North Stars between 1985 and 1988, scoring one goal and two assists while spending most of his career in the minor leagues.  He played two seasons in the Netherlands between 1989 and 1991 before retiring. His son, Jackson Houck, was drafted 94th overall by the Edmonton Oilers in the 2013 NHL Entry Draft. Paul, of the 1981 NHL Entry Draft, and his son, of the 2013 NHL Entry Draft, become the first father-and-son tandem drafted by the Edmonton Oilers in the team's history.

Career statistics

Regular season and playoffs

Awards and honors

References

External links

1963 births
Living people
Canadian ice hockey right wingers
Indianapolis Ice players
Edmonton Oilers draft picks
Kalamazoo Wings (1974–2000) players
Minnesota North Stars players
Nova Scotia Oilers players
Springfield Indians players
Wisconsin Badgers men's ice hockey players
Ice hockey people from Vancouver
NCAA men's ice hockey national champions